Golden Square may refer to:
Golden Square, London
Golden Square, Victoria, a suburb of Bendigo (Australia)
Golden Square Football Club, an Australian rules football club which competes in the Bendigo Football League
Golden Square railway station, a closed station on the Melbourne-Bendigo railway
Golden Square Secondary College
Golden Square Mile, former (1875–1930) luxurious neighbourhood in Montreal, Canada
Golden Square Shopping Centre in Warrington, Cheshire, England
Golden Square (Iraq) - the 1941 Iraqi coup d'état, also known as the Golden Square coup, was a pro-Nazi military coup in Iraq on April 1, 1941, that overthrew the British-backed regime of Regent 'Abd al-Ilah. It was led by four Iraqi nationalist army generals, known as "the Golden Square." 
Two squares whose size is related by the golden ratio